Maksim Naumov (born 5 August 1970) is a former Russian football player.

References

1970 births
Living people
Soviet footballers
FC Dynamo Moscow reserves players
Russian footballers
FC Tyumen players
Russian Premier League players
Association football defenders
FC Asmaral Moscow players